Pyruvic acid (IUPAC name: 2-Oxopropanoic acid, also called Acetoic acid or Acetocarboxylic acid) (CH3COCOOH) is the simplest of the alpha-keto acids, with a carboxylic acid and a ketone functional group. Pyruvate, the conjugate base, CH3COCOO−, is an intermediate in several metabolic pathways throughout the cell.

Pyruvic acid can be made from glucose through glycolysis, converted back to carbohydrates (such as glucose) via gluconeogenesis, or to fatty acids through a reaction with acetyl-CoA. It can also be used to construct the amino acid alanine and can be converted into ethanol or lactic acid via fermentation.

Pyruvic acid supplies energy to cells through the citric acid cycle (also known as the Krebs cycle) when oxygen is present (aerobic respiration), and alternatively ferments to produce lactate when oxygen is lacking.

Chemistry
In 1834, Théophile-Jules Pelouze distilled tartaric acid and isolated glutaric acid and another unknown organic acid. Jöns Jacob Berzelius characterized this other acid the following year and named pyruvic acid because it was distilled using heat. The correct molecular structure was deduced by the 1870s. Pyruvic acid is a colorless liquid with a smell similar to that of acetic acid and is miscible with water. In the laboratory, pyruvic acid may be prepared by heating a mixture of tartaric acid and potassium hydrogen sulfate, by the oxidation of propylene glycol by a strong oxidizer (e.g., potassium permanganate or bleach), or by the hydrolysis of acetyl cyanide, formed by reaction of acetyl chloride with potassium cyanide:
CH3COCl + KCN → CH3COCN + KCl
CH3COCN → CH3COCOOH

Biochemistry
Pyruvate is an important chemical compound in biochemistry. It is the output of the metabolism of glucose known as glycolysis. One molecule of glucose breaks down into two molecules of pyruvate, which are then used to provide further energy, in one of two ways.  Pyruvate is converted into acetyl-coenzyme A, which is the main input for a series of reactions known as the Krebs cycle (also known as the citric acid cycle or tricarboxylic acid cycle). Pyruvate is also  converted to oxaloacetate by an anaplerotic reaction, which replenishes Krebs cycle intermediates; also, the oxaloacetate is used for gluconeogenesis. These reactions are named after Hans Adolf Krebs, the biochemist awarded the 1953 Nobel Prize for physiology, jointly with Fritz Lipmann, for research into metabolic processes. The cycle is also known as the citric acid cycle or tricarboxylic acid cycle, because citric acid is one of the intermediate compounds formed during the reactions.

If insufficient oxygen is available, the acid is broken down anaerobically, creating lactate in animals and ethanol in plants and microorganisms (and carp). Pyruvate from glycolysis is converted by fermentation to lactate using the enzyme lactate dehydrogenase and the coenzyme NADH in lactate fermentation, or to acetaldehyde (with the enzyme pyruvate decarboxylase) and then to ethanol in alcoholic fermentation.

Pyruvate is a key intersection in the network of metabolic pathways. Pyruvate can be converted into carbohydrates via gluconeogenesis, to fatty acids or energy through acetyl-CoA, to the amino acid alanine, and to ethanol. Therefore, it unites several key metabolic processes.

Pyruvic acid production by glycolysis
In glycolysis, phosphoenolpyruvate (PEP) is converted to pyruvate by pyruvate kinase.  This reaction is strongly exergonic and irreversible; in gluconeogenesis, it takes two enzymes, pyruvate carboxylase and PEP carboxykinase, to catalyze the reverse transformation of pyruvate to PEP.

  

Pyruvate molecules

Decarboxylation to acetyl CoA
Pyruvate decarboxylation by the pyruvate dehydrogenase complex produces acetyl-CoA.

Carboxylation to oxaloacetate
Carboxylation by pyruvate carboxylase produces oxaloacetate.

Transamination to alanine
Transamination by alanine transaminase produces alanine.

Reduction to lactate
Reduction by lactate dehydrogenase produces lactate.

Environmental chemistry 
Pyruvic acid is an abundant carboxylic acid in secondary organic aerosols.

Uses
Pyruvate is sold as a weight-loss supplement, though credible science has yet to back this claim. A systematic review of six trials found a statistically significant difference in body weight with pyruvate compared to placebo. However, all of the trials had methodological weaknesses and the magnitude of the effect was small. The review also identified adverse events associated with pyruvate such as diarrhea, bloating, gas, and increase in low-density lipoprotein (LDL) cholesterol. The authors concluded that there was insufficient evidence to support the use of pyruvate for weight loss.

There is also in vitro as well as in vivo evidence in hearts that pyruvate improves metabolism by NADH production stimulation and increases cardiac function.

See also 
 Pyruvate scale

Notes

References

External links
 Pyruvic acid mass spectrum

Alpha-keto acids
Cellular respiration
Exercise physiology
Metabolism
Glycolysis